Little Muncy Creek is the major tributary of Muncy Creek in Lycoming and Sullivan Counties, Pennsylvania, United States. Via Muncy Creek and the West Branch Susquehanna River, it is part of the Susquehanna River drainage basin and waters from it flow ultimately into the Chesapeake Bay.

Course

Little Muncy Creek has its source in Davidson Township in Sullivan County, then flows south in Jordan Township in Lycoming County. It then flows west into Franklin Township and the village of Lairdsville, running parallel to Pennsylvania Route 118 here. Further west it enters Moreland Township and passes the village of Opp, before entering Muncy Creek Township, where it flows into Muncy Creek just west of the village of Clarkstown. Other streams feeding Little Muncy Creek include Marsh Run, Beaver Run, Laurel Run, Big Run, German Run, and Little Indian Run.

Watershed
The Little Muncy Creek watershed has a total area of 82 mi² (212.4 km²) and a total population of 3,735 (as of 2000). Approximately 87.4% of the Little Muncy Creek watershed is in Lycoming County, 5.7% is in Columbia County, 5.3% is in Sullivan County, and 1.5% is in Montour County. Of that area, 48 mi² (124.3 km²) are forested and 34 mi² (88.1 km²) are given to agricultural uses.

See also
List of rivers of Pennsylvania
Wolf Run (Muncy Creek)

References

General
Pennsylvania Department of Environmental Protection 2001 Pennsylvania Gazetteer of Streams
Lycoming County Watersheds Map
History of Lycoming County Pennsylvania edited by John F. Meginness, ©1892 (copyright expired)
Official Lycoming County Map showing all townships, villages, boroughs, cities, county roads, rivers, creeks, and some streams

Little Muncy Creek
Chesapeake Bay Program page on Little Muncy Creek Watershed
Lycoming County Stream Gauge Data for Little Muncy Creek:
Gauge in Muncy Creek Township
Gauge at Lairdsville

External links

Rivers of Pennsylvania
Tributaries of Muncy Creek
Rivers of Lycoming County, Pennsylvania
Rivers of Sullivan County, Pennsylvania